The Oman Basketball League (OBA) (also referred to as "Samsung Basketball League" as of 2010) is a men's basketball league in the Sultanate of Oman. 

A recent referee addition to the league is Fatma Hamood al Harthy, the first woman in Oman to become a sports referee.

Teams
The league comprises seven teams:
 Al Bashaer
 Nizwa
 Ahli-Sidab
 Al Seeb
 Oman
 Quriyat
 Al Nasr

Champions 

 2021: Al Bashaer

Finals

References

Further reading
 
 
 

Basketball
Basketball leagues in Asia